"Stop! In the Name of Love" is a 1965 song recorded by the Supremes for the Motown label.

Written and produced by Motown's main production team Holland–Dozier–Holland, "Stop! In the Name of Love" held the #1 position on the Billboard pop singles chart in the United States from March 27, 1965, through April 3, 1965, and reached the #2 position on the soul chart.

Billboard named the song #38 on their list of 100 Greatest Girl Group Songs of All Time. The BBC ranked "Stop! In the Name of Love" at #56 on The Top 100 Digital Motown Chart, which ranks Motown releases by their all time UK downloads and streams.

In 2021, it was listed at No. 254 on Rolling Stone's "Top 500 Greatest Songs of All Time".

History
The song was written by Eddie Holland, Lamont Dozier, and Brian Holland.  Dozier said that he got the idea after he got cheated on by his girlfriend. In the heat of the argument, he said, "Baby, please stop. In the name of love- before you break my heart."

The Supremes recorded "Stop! In the Name of Love" in January 1965 and released as a single on February 8. The song was included on the Supremes' sixth album, More Hits by The Supremes, and was nominated for the 1966 Grammy Award for Best Contemporary Rock & Roll Group Vocal Performance, losing to "Flowers on the Wall" by the Statler Brothers.

Cash Box described it as "a rousing, shufflin’ pop-blues romancer about a gal who cautions her boyfriend to go a little bit slower" that should "continue in [the Supremes] fantastic chart-riding ways."

The Supremes' choreography for this song involved one hand on the hip and the other outstretched in a "stop" gesture. They performed it on an episode of the ABC variety program Shindig! which aired on Wednesday, February 24, 1965.

Personnel
 Lead vocals by Diana Ross
 Backing vocals by Florence Ballard, Mary Wilson and the Andantes: Jackie Hicks, Marlene Barrow and Louvain Demps  
 All instruments by the Funk Brothers
Johnny Griffith – organ
James Gittens – piano 
Joe Messina – guitar
James Jamerson – bass 
Benny Benjamin – drums
Jack Ashford – vibraphone
Mike Terry – baritone saxophone

Charts

Weekly charts

Year-end charts

Certifications

Cover versions and other uses
 The Hollies' version in 1983 peaked in the US at #29 and in Canada at #31, from the album What Goes Around...
 Scottish singer Barbara Dickson released her version in 1983 from the album Heartbeats, peaking at #29 in Belgium.
 American singer La Toya Jackson recorded it for her 1995 album Stop in the Name of Love.
 Japanese dance pop group Globe (band) included it on their 2002 album Lights.
 Icelandic band Bang Gang released their rendition on the 2003 album Something Wrong.
The song is featured in the 1979 Universal Pictures film More American Graffiti and is also included in the soundtrack.

See also
 List of Hot 100 number-one singles of 1965 (U.S.)

References

External links
 List of cover versions of "Stop! In the Name of Love" at SecondHandSongs.com
 

1965 songs
1965 singles
1983 singles
The Supremes songs
The Hollies songs
Gloria Gaynor songs
Barbara Dickson songs
Motown singles
Atlantic Records singles
Billboard Hot 100 number-one singles
Cashbox number-one singles
Songs written by Holland–Dozier–Holland
Song recordings produced by Brian Holland
Song recordings produced by Lamont Dozier
Songs about infidelity
The Jackson 5 songs